The  is a two-car electric multiple unit (EMU) train type operated by the Japanese private railway operator Hakone Tozan Railway on its steeply graded Hakone Tozan Line since May 2017.

Overview
The fleet is branded "Allegra". The general design of the trains was overseen by Noriaki Okabe Architecture Network, with the train finished in the standard Hakone Tozan Railway livery of "Vermillion Hakone" and silver highlights. The trains can operate in multiple with 3000 series EMU cars to form three-car sets.

Formation
The two car set is formed as follows.

Interior
Passenger accommodation consists mostly of four-person seating bays, with a wheelchair spaces in both cars. Seating is provided for 40 passengers in each car, including six pairs of tip-up seats. The trains use LED lighting throughout.

History
Hakone Tozan Railway announced details of the new 3100 series train in December 2016, scheduled to enter service in May 2017. The first unit was delivered from Kawasaki Heavy Industries in Kobe in April 2017. The two-car train entered revenue service on 15 May 2017. A second train was delivered from Kawasaki Heavy Industries in October 2020.

References

External links

  

Electric multiple units of Japan
3100
Train-related introductions in 2017
ja:箱根登山鉄道3100形電車
Kawasaki multiple units
750 V DC multiple units
1500 V DC multiple units of Japan